Live: The Filmore is a live recording by Pete Townshend.  It was recorded at The Fillmore in San Francisco, California on 30 April 1996 and released 30 October 2000 by UK company Eel Pie Recording Productions Ltd. Townshend was accompanied by Jon Carin on keyboards.

Track listing
All songs written and composed by Pete Townshend except where noted.

References

2000 live albums
Pete Townshend live albums